Veton Surroi  (born 17 July 1961) is a Kosovo-Albanian publicist, politician and former journalist. Surroi is the founder and former leader of the ORA political party, and was a member of Kosovo assembly from 2004 to 2008. Veton Surroi in 1997 established one of the biggest Kosovo Albanian daily newspapers Koha Ditore and was the editor-in-chief for a number of years before deciding to enter politics in Kosovo. Surroi's father, Rexhai Surroi, was one of the very few Albanians to become ambassadors of the former Yugoslavia. His father was the Yugoslav ambassador to Spain and a number of Latin American countries. As a result, Surroi spent a part of his life in the Spanish-speaking world where he was also educated.

Veton Surroi studied Modern English Language and Literature at the National Autonomous University of Mexico (UNAM). Surroi is a polyglot, speaking four languages, namely Albanian, English, Serbian and Spanish.

Surroi won the 2011 SEEMO Human Rights Award.

References

1961 births
Living people
Kosovo Albanians
Reformist Party ORA politicians
Newspaper founders
Albanian publishers (people)
Politicians from Pristina
Writers from Pristina